Aap Ke Liye Hum, earlier titled Chaasni, is a Hindi film directed by Revathy S Varma. The film stars Jaya Bachchan, Mithun Chakraborty, Manisha Koirala, Raveena Tandon, Ayesha Takia Azmi and Ranvir Shorey in the lead roles. It is a remake of the 2006 Tamil film June R.

Plot
Aap Ke Liye Hum is about an adopted mother, played by Jaya Bachchan, abandoned by her wretched son, played by Ranvir Shorey.

Cast
 Jaya Bachchan
 Mithun Chakraborty
 Manisha Koirala
 Raveena Tandon
 Ayesha Takia Azmi as Tamanna
 Ranvir Shorey as Rohit

Soundtrack 
The Pakistani song "Huma Huma" was reused in this film.

Reception

References 

2010s Hindi-language films
Hindi remakes of Tamil films
2013 films